Stanley Pavey (1913–1984) was a British cinematographer.

Selected filmography
 Dreaming (1944)
 They Came to a City (1944)
 Pink String and Sealing Wax (1945)
 Here Comes the Sun (1946)
 Daughter of Darkness (1948)
 The Happiest Days of Your Life (1950)
 The Galloping Major (1951)
 Mother Riley Meets the Vampire (1952)
 The Happiness of Three Women (1954)
 The Belles of St. Trinian's (1954)
 The Man in the Road (1956)
 Hour of Decision (1957)
 Too Many Crooks (1959)
 Mrs. Gibbons' Boys (1962)
 Mystery Submarine (1963)
 Girl in the Headlines (1963)

References

External links
 

1913 births
1984 deaths
British cinematographers
Film people from London